The 1913–14 Luxembourg National Division was the fourth season of top level association football in Luxembourg.

Overview
It was performed by 6 teams, and US Hollerich won the championship.

League standings

References
Luxembourg - List of final tables (RSSSF)

1913-14
1913–14 in European association football leagues
Nat